Long Drax (also known as Langrick) is a small hamlet and civil parish in the Selby District of North Yorkshire, England, about 2 miles north-east of Drax. In 2011 it had a population of 125.

The settlement consists of a linear string of houses along the bank of the River Ouse, as well as several scattered farms.

To the west of Long Drax is the site of Drax Priory. Founded in the 1130s, the Priory was dedicated to St. Nicholas and is believed to have been moated. It was subsequently destroyed during the Dissolution of the Monasteries in 1535. A farmhouse was built on the site in the 18th century and later became a meeting place for Quakers. The site is now known as Drax Abbey farm and has been a scheduled monument since 1964.

The village was historically part of the West Riding of Yorkshire until 1974.

See also
Long Drax swing bridge

References

External links

Civil parishes in North Yorkshire
Selby District
Villages in North Yorkshire